The Hokkaido red-backed vole (Myodes rex) is a species of rodent in the family Cricetidae. It is found at high altitudes on the island of Hokkaido in Japan and at lower altitudes on some smaller islands nearby. Its natural habitat is temperate forests.

Distribution
The Hokkaido red-backed vole occurs in the southwestern part of Hokkaido in the Hidaka Mountains, Daisetsuzan Volcanic Group, Teshio Mountains, and Kitami Mountains, and Shiribeshi Province, Oshima Subprefecture and Hiyama Subprefecture. It is also present at lower altitudes on the islands of Rishiri and Rebun, as well as Shikotan in the Kuril Islands and Shibotsu in the Habomai Islands. It is found in forests and is an adaptable species. Population genetic structuring is rather strong on Hokkaido, with different regions being characterised by different genetic lineages.

Status
This is because the population seems stable, the vole faces no significant threats and it is present in some protected areas.

References

Musser, G. G. and M. D. Carleton. 2005. Superfamily Muroidea. pp. 894–1531 in Mammal Species of the World a Taxonomic and Geographic Reference. D. E. Wilson and D. M. Reeder eds. Johns Hopkins University Press, Baltimore.
,  and : New species of Red-Backed Vole (Mammalia: Rodentia: Cricetidae) in fauna of Russia: Molecular and morphologic evidences. Proceedings of the Zoological Institute RAS, Vol. 313, No. 1, 2009, рр. 3–9

Myodes
Mammals described in 1971
Endemic fauna of Japan
Mammals of Japan
Taxonomy articles created by Polbot